Henry Langford was an English MP.

Henry Langford may also refer to:

Henry Langford of the Langford baronets
Captain Sir Henry Langford, fictional character in The Bolitho novels

See also
Harry Langford, Canadian footballer